Trisanchi is a rural locality (a selo) and the administrative centre of Trisanchinsky Selsoviet, Dakhadayevsky District, Republic of Dagestan, Russia. The population was 1,516 as of 2010. There are 4 streets.

Geography 
Trisanchi is located 12 km southeast of Urkarakh (the district's administrative centre) by road. Zubanchi and Kudagu are the nearest rural localities.

Nationalities 
Dargins live there.

References 

Rural localities in Dakhadayevsky District